Elections for the Pennsylvania State Senate were held on November 4, 2008, with odd-numbered districts being contested. Republicans had a net gain of 1 seat for the 2008 elections, expanding their majority to 30-20.  State Senators are elected for four-year terms, with half of the Senate seats up for a vote every two years. The term of office for those elected in 2008 will run from December 1, 2008 until December 1, 2012. Necessary primary elections were held on April 22, 2008.

Make-up of the Senate following the 2008 elections

General Elections

(see note)

1 Senator Rhoades died prior to the election but remained on the ballot.  As he was posthumously re-elected, his seat will be filled by a special election.

References

2008 Pennsylvania elections
2008
Pennsylvania Senate